The Modern Review was a magazine based in Richmond Hill, Ontario, Canada that styles itself a "North American literary journal".

The first issue, 58 pages thick, is dated September 2005. It is published quarterly by the Parsifal Press Literary Arts Association, a nonprofit organization. All printing, binding, and finishing is done in-house with professional machinery.

The magazine describes its philosophy this way: The editorial mission of the Modern Review is to dispute literary borders on an international stage, to educate, and to foster both an appreciation and desire for a higher standard in the written arts. To make no alliances, and cultivate no preference of one class or movement over another, but to act as a point where artistic integrity meets the risk-taking means which will promote its cause with zeal and diligence. The desired end is sustained access to a relevant literature, one that refuses to oppose tradition to innovation, the personal to the objective.

(ISSN 1557-265X)

Masthead
Editor-in-Chief: Simone dos Anjos
Editor: Pietro Aman
Advisors: Jennifer Moxley, Geoffrey G. O'Brien

Contributors
John Ashbery 
Robert Bly
Landis Everson
Espido Freire
Peter Gizzi
Fanny Howe 
Andrew Joron
Robert Kelly
John Kinsella
Ángela Labordeta
William Logan
Jennifer Moxley
Geoffrey G. O'Brien
Marjorie Perloff
Socorro Venegas
Joshua Marie Wilkinson

Notes

External links 
 Parsifal Press

2005 establishments in Ontario
Literary magazines published in Canada
Magazines established in 2005
Magazines published in Ontario